The 1985 Strongbow Irish Professional Championship was a professional invitational snooker tournament, which took place between 8 and 11 April 1985 at the Ulster Hall in Belfast, Northern Ireland.

Dennis Taylor won the title beating Alex Higgins 10–5 in the final.

Qualifying rounds

Round 1
  Jack McLaughlin 6–3 Dessie Sheehan

Round 2
  Pascal Burke 6–3 Tony Kearney 
  Billy Kelly 6–2 Paul Watchorn 
  Tommy Murphy 6–3 Paddy Browne 
  Jackie Rea 6–5 Jack McLaughlin

Main draw

References

Irish Professional Championship
Irish Professional Championship
Irish Professional Championship
Irish Professional Championship